Harold Campbell Adamson (December 10, 1906 – August 17, 1980) was an American lyricist during the 1930s and 1940s.

Early life
Adamson, the son of building contractor Harold Adamson and Marion "Minnie" Campbell Adamson, was born and raised in Greenville, New Jersey, United States.

Adamson suffered from polio as a child which limited the use of his right hand. Initially, Adamson was interested in acting, but he began writing songs and poetry as a teenager.

He went on to studying acting at the University of Kansas and Harvard.

Career
Ultimately he entered into a songwriting contract with MGM in 1933. During his stint with MGM, he was nominated for five Academy Awards. Among his best-known compositions was the theme for the hit sitcom, I Love Lucy.

He retired from songwriting in the early 1960s, and was inducted into the Songwriters Hall of Fame in 1972.

In 1941, he collaborated with Pierce Norman, and baseball's Joe DiMaggio to write "In the Beauty of Tahoe", published by Larry Spier, Inc.

Songs or lyrics by Harold Adamson
 "An Affair to Remember"
 "Around the World"
 "Comin' In on a Wing and a Prayer"
 "Daybreak"
 "Everything I Have Is Yours" (with Burton Lane)
"Eighty Miles Outside of Atlanta". From the 1944 film Something for the Boys starring Carmen Miranda, Michael O'Shea, and Vivian Blaine
 "Ferry-Boat Serenade" (with E. Di Lazzaro)
 "How Blue the Night" (music by Jimmy McHugh, recorded by Dick Haymes March 5, 1944)
 "I Couldn't Sleep a Wink Last Night" nominated for an Oscar for Best Song, also featured in the 1943 film Higher and Higher, sung by Frank Sinatra
 "I Love Lucy (And She Loves Me)"
 "I Wish I Were a Fish", from the 1964 film The Incredible Mr. Limpet, sung by Don Knotts
 "It's a Wonderful World"
 "It's a Most Unusual Day"
 "I've Come to California", theme song for the NBC television series The Californians
 "A Lovely Way to Spend an Evening" from the 1943 film Higher and Higher, sung by Frank Sinatra
 "Manhattan Serenade"
 "My Resistance Is Low"
 "The Little Man Who Wasn't There"
 "There's Something in the Air"
 "Time on My Hands" (with Mack Gordon and Vincent Youmans)
 "We're Having a Baby (My Baby and Me)" 1941.  Music by Vernon Duke.  Sung by Desi Arnaz
 "When Love Goes Wrong" with Howard Hoagland Carmichael for Gentlemen Prefer Blondes.
 "Where Are You?". Music by Jimmy McHugh
 "Winter Moon" . Music by Hoagy Carmichael  
 "You're a Sweetheart" (1937) Music by Jimmy McHugh

Notes

References
American National Biography, vol. 1, pp. 135–136.
- Bruce Adamson on website has free video

External links
Additional information on Harold Adamson
Bio on Music Theater International site

1906 births
1980 deaths
Musicians from Jersey City, New Jersey
University of Kansas alumni
Harvard University alumni
American musical theatre lyricists
Songwriters from New Jersey
20th-century American composers